Luke Farmer (born 25 September 1980) is an Australian rules football field umpire in the Australian Football League. He has umpired 185 career games in the AFL. He debuted in a Round 1 match between Adelaide and Essendon at AAMI Stadium on 1 April 2007.

He is currently a secondary school physical education teacher at Christ Church Grammar School, Western Australia, and has a Bachelor of Science and a Diploma in Education.

Footnotes

External links 
 Luke Farmer at AFL Tables

1980 births
Living people
Australian Football League umpires
Australian schoolteachers